The Aberdeen Wings are a Tier II junior ice hockey team based out of Aberdeen, South Dakota, that began play for 2010–11.  A member of the North American Hockey League in the Central Division, the Wings play their home games in the Odde Ice Center.

History
Since the team's inaugural season in 2010–11, the Wings have held the highest attendance numbers in their NAHL division, boasting crowds over 1,700. In their first four seasons, the Aberdeen Wings have made the NAHL playoffs twice. The goal of any junior hockey team is to help develop players for the next level. In four seasons, the Wings have had 22 players Division-I college commitments, three players sign professional contracts overseas, and two players drafted in the NHL. During the 2014 NHL Draft, two Aberdeen Wings players were selected. Both taken in the 4th round, goaltender Zach Nagelvoort was drafted by the Edmonton Oilers and defenseman Steven Johnson was selected by the Los Angeles Kings. Wings forward Lennart Palausch signed a professional contract during the 2014 off-season with Heilbronner Falken of the DEL2 in Germany. In the 2013–14 season, the Aberdeen Wings had two players selected to play in the 2014 World Junior Championships for their home countries, including forward Lennart Palausch (Germany) and forward Bjorn Sigurdarson (Iceland). Parks Wallace

The 2014–15 was the first season under head coach Francis Anzalone. A native of Sault Ste. Marie, Michigan, Anzalone served as the associate head coach and director of player personnel during the previous season under Wings head coach Travis Winter. During the 2014 off-season, Winter accepted the assistant coach position at his alma mater, Bemidji State University, where he led the Beavers hockey team as captain to the Frozen Four in 2009. Anzalone came from a hockey family that includes his father, Frank Anzalone who was a national championship college hockey coach, minor league head coach, and scout for the Calgary Flames. Anzalone was fired as head coach at the end of the 2015–16 season after two losing seasons and missing the playoffs.

Two days after releasing Anzalone, the Wings announced it had hired long time NAHL coach Scott Langer as head coach. Langer had coached the previous 12 seasons with the Santa Fe/Topeka RoadRunners organization before being released during the 2015–16 season. In his first season as coach of the Wings, the team advanced to the 2017 Robertson Cup tournament and lost to the Aston Rebels. The Wings then won the regular season division titles in each of the following two seasons culminating in the 2019 Robertson Cup league championship. Langer was also named the general manager in January 2019.

In the 2019–20 season, the Wings were again leading the Central Division when the season was curtailed due to the onset of the COVID-19 pandemic. The start of the 2020–21 season was then delayed by one month and was slightly shortened from the typical 60 games to 56 games for the Wings. Despite the shorter season, the Wings set the league record for number of regular season wins with 51 and 103 points. Following the season, Langer was hired as the head coach for the Fargo Force in the United States Hockey League and Steve Jennings was named as the next Wings' head coach.

Season-by-season records

References

External links
 North American Hockey League Official Website
 Aberdeen Wings Official Website

North American Hockey League teams
Ice hockey clubs established in 2010
North American Hockey League
Aberdeen, South Dakota
Ice hockey teams in South Dakota
2010 establishments in South Dakota
Sports teams in Aberdeen, South Dakota